The Reading by-election was a Parliamentary by-election held on 8 November 1913. The constituency returned one Member of Parliament (MP) to the House of Commons of the United Kingdom, elected by the first past the post voting system.

Vacancy
Sir Rufus Isaacs was appointed Lord Chief Justice of England and Wales created Baron Reading and given a seat in the House of Lords. He had been Liberal MP for Reading since 1903.

Electoral history
Isaacs had won the last four parliamentary elections in Reading, but at the last General Election he only just managed to hold off the Conservative challenge;

This made Reading one of the most marginal seats in the country.

Candidates
The local Liberal Association were unable to find a local candidate, and after some difficulties, settled on the wealthy and radical outsider George Peabody Gooch to defend the seat. He was elected at the 1906 general election as Member of Parliament (MP) for Bath, but lost the seat at the January 1910 general election. He stood again in Bath at the December 1910 general election, but did not regain the seat, Gooch's candidacy provoked the threat of an anti-vaccinationist candidate from within the local party.

The local Unionists re-selected Leslie Orme Wilson. In January 1910, at the General Election, he unsuccessfully stood as the Conservative candidate for Poplar. In December 1910, he was Unionist candidate for Reading, but was defeated by the sitting Liberal candidate, Sir Isaac Rufus, the Attorney-General.

A third candidate entered the contest in the figure of J. G. Butler, who was a member of the British Socialist Party. Butler was from London and in March 1913 he had contested the 1913 London County Council election at Stepney, where he had polled poorly. He secured the backing of the Reading Trades Council and the Reading branch of the Independent Labour Party.

Background
If the Unionists were to hope to win a majority at the next General Election expected to take place in 1914/15, they would need to win Reading as it was statistically No17 on their target list. The intervention of a Socialist candidate at the by-election, thus gave them a good opportunity to gain the seat and establish their candidate as the incumbent.

Campaign
In the last week of the campaign, following on from an announcement made by Chancellor of the Exchequer, David Lloyd George, of a new rural land policy, the Liberal campaign circulated a leaflet proclaiming Vote for Gooch and the new Liberal land policy – the wage raising policy for Reading. It argued that higher agricultural wages would lead to higher wages in towns. It also argued that a revival in the rural economy would stop labourers migrating to towns and causing unemployment and that a more prosperous countryside would buy more of Reading's products.

Result

Although the Unionists gained the seat, the fact that the Unionist share of the vote only increased by 0.8% indicated that they would struggle to hold the seat at a General Election when no Socialist would be standing.

Aftermath
A General Election was due to take place by the end of 1915. By the summer of 1914, the following candidates had been adopted to contest that election. Due to the outbreak of war, the election never took place.

Wilson was the endorsed candidate of the Coalition Government.

References

 Craig, F. W. S. (1974). British parliamentary election results 1885–1918 (1 ed.). London: Macmillan. 
 Who's Who: www.ukwhoswho.com 
 Debrett's House of Commons 1916

1913 elections in the United Kingdom
1913 in England
20th century in Berkshire
By-elections to the Parliament of the United Kingdom in Berkshire constituencies
Politics of Reading, Berkshire